Søren Brostrøm (born 4 June 1965) is a Danish physician-scientist specializing in obstetrics and gynaecology, who serves as the current Director General of the Danish Health Authority. In May 2021, Brostrøm was elected a member of the Executive Board of the World Health Organization by the World Health Assembly.

Brostrøm has previously been a member (from 2017), Vice-chair (from 2018), and Chair (from 2019), of the Standing Committee of the European Regional Committee (SCRC), as well as (ex officio) Deputy Executive President of the WHO Regional Committee for Europe (69th session; 2019–2020). He held these posts during the COVID-19 pandemic, and as chairperson he led the committee's crisis management and response.

Before becoming director general in 2015, Brostrøm served, from September 2011, as the Director of the Department of Hospitals and Emergency Management, also at the Danish Health Authority. Brostrøm worked as a chief physician at Herlev Hospital and as an associate professor at the University of Copenhagen, before joining the Danish Health Authority.

Following the COVID-19 pandemic, Brostrøm became a prominent public figure in Denmark, where he played a key role in the Danish response to COVID-19, which has been described as "one of the most successful in Europe." In Denmark, he became widely known as the "corona general", and was especially praised for his "directness and clarity with which he speaks" and his reliance on facts and logic.

Early life and education 
Søren Brostrøm was born in Aarhus in 1965, the second son of two medical doctors; his mother a paediatrician and his father a cancer researcher. He grew up in Risskov and Farsø. His father died in an accident when Brostrøm was 11 years old, and the family moved to Mobile, Alabama, where Brostrøm experienced different social conditions. Brostrom said in a 2020-interview that "the tragedy has left an everlasting mark on me" and that life after his father's death was burdened by "both grief and a tough financial situation".

In the early 1980s, Søren Brostrøm was the international secretary of the Danish Communist Youth League.

From an early age, he was interested in biology and mathematics. Brostrøm has said in connection with his profession and education that "although my parents were doctors, it was my own choice, but I was probably also very influenced by them."

In 1995, Brostrøm received a Master of Science in Medicine (cand. med.) degree from the University of Copenhagen. In 2003, he obtained his PhD degree in obstetrics and gynaecology, with a subspecialization in urogynecology, focused on laparoscopic pelvic surgery. He completed a Master of Public Administration from the Copenhagen Business School in 2011. In 2019, he completed a Senior Managers in Government (SMG) program at Harvard Kennedy School of Government.

His PhD thesis was on motor evoked potentials from the pelvic floor and lower urinary tract dysfunction.

Career 
He made a career in several Copenhagen hospitals as a gynaecological surgeon and was one of the leading doctors in Europe in performing a special robotic-assisted operation in which the top of the vagina is stitched open.

After his medical training, Brostrøm worked in 2007 as an attending physician at the gynaecological-obstetric department at Aarhus University Hospital Skejby. He then worked as a chief physician at the gynaecological-obstetric department at Glostrup Hospital from 2007 to 2008. From 2009 to 2011 he worked as a chief physician at the gynaecological-obstetric department at Herlev University Hospital.

For two years from 2009 to 2011, Brostrøm worked concurrently as an associate professor at the Department of Gynaecology and Obstetrics (now part of the Department of Clinical Medicine) at the Faculty of Health and Medical Sciences at the University of Copenhagen, and completed a Master of Public Administration (MPA) at Copenhagen Business School.

Danish Health Authority 
In September 2011, Brostrøm joined the Danish Health Authority as the Director of the Department of Hospitals and Emergency Management, with broad responsibilities for the national planning of specialized hospital services, emergency services and preparedness, communicable diseases, immunization and screening programs as well as national action plans in the field of cancer, cardiovascular diseases, mental health etc.

The responsibilities also included health preparedness and infectious diseases, which is where the Authority's pandemic preparedness lies. During the COVID-19 pandemic ten years later, Brostrøm would come to rely on the experience and knowledge he gained as department head.

Director-General 
In October 2015, Brostrøm was appointed Director General of the Danish Health Authority, which was immediately afterwards heavily reshaped by a comprehensive organizational change, where major areas such as patient safety, approval of medicines and handling of health data were placed in independent authorities. The Danish Health Authority remained the overall authority.

One of his first major tasks was to complete the update of the specialty plan, which dictates which hospitals can perform complicated treatments and which cannot. It came into force in June 2017 after extensive committee work and many critical debates in medical circles.

Public attention 
Brostrøm came to public attention when the Danish Health Authority's HPV vaccination programme in 2014-15 experienced a sudden and large drop in uptake among the target group, girls and young women, who feared serious side effects. Brostrøm took responsibility for inadequate communication and did so in an open and personal manner, which has also been characteristic of his appearance at numerous press conferences and interviews in connection with the handling of the COVID-19 pandemic.

Personal life and interests 
Brostrøm is interested in art, theatre and the opera. Brostrøm is openly homosexual.

HIV/AIDS impact on Brostrøm 
Brostrom spoke in an interview in 2020 about how the HIV and AIDS global epidemic affected his youth: "HIV and AIDS is the disease I myself grew up with. Both as a young gay man and as a young medical student." Brostrøm described how the disease came as a shock and put a damper on the free and uninhibited sexuality that had taken hold in the gay community throughout the 1960s and 70s. Brostrøm said, "In 1992 I was in the US as part of (medical) school, and from that period I remember it very clearly. There was a lot of debate and the disease was shrouded in taboo. There were religious and conservative groups who called HIV and AIDS God's punishment on homosexuals. At that time I saw young beautiful men lying dead. People like myself."

Memberships, chairmanships and organizational work 
Brostrøm has been chairman and board member of a number of organizations. List:

Danish 

 Member of the Board of the Danish Society of Obstetrics and Gynaecology.
 2001-2003: President of the Danish Association of Young Gynaecologists and Obstetricians (FYGO).
 2008-2011: President of the Danish FIGO-foundation.
 2018-2022: Member of the Board of the Danish Health Fund.

Governmental 

 2014–present: Chair of the National Task Force on Cancer and Heart Disease.
 2014–present: Chair of the National Task Force on Mental Health.
 2015–present: Advisory role to Cabinet and Parliament.
 2015–present: Executive officer in the Ministry of Health.

International 

 2001-2002: Member of the Executive Committee of the European Network of Trainees in Obstetrics and Gynaecology (ENTOG)
 2003-2005: President of the European Network of Trainees in Obstetrics and Gynaecology (ENTOG).
 2003-2006: Board Member of the European Board and College of Obstetrics and Gynaecology (EBCOG).
 2008-2011: Member of the Scientific Committee of the International Urogynaecology Association (IUGA).
 2008-2011: President of the Nordic Urogynaecology Association (NUGA).
 2010-2012: Secretary general of the International Urogynecological Association (IUGA).
 2012-2015: Member of the Health Security Committee (HSC) of the European Union

World Health Organization 

 2017-2018: Member of the Standing Committee of the European Regional Committee (SCRC) of the WHO.
 2018: Vice-chair of the WHO World Health Assembly Committee A
 2018-2019: Vice-chair of the Standing Committee of the European Regional Committee (SCRC) of the WHO.
 2019-2020: Chair of the Standing Committee of the European Regional Committee (SCRC) of the WHO.
 2019-2020: Deputy Executive President of the WHO Regional Committee for Europe.
 2021-2024: Member of the Executive Board of the World Health Organization.

Awards and honours

National 

 :
  Knight of the Order of the Dannebrog (2018)

Selected works and publications

Journals

Books

Notes

References 

1965 births
Living people
Physician-scientists
Danish civil servants
COVID-19 pandemic in Denmark
University of Copenhagen alumni
COVID-19 researchers
Obstetrics
Gynaecologists
People from Aarhus
World Health Organization officials
LGBT scientists